Jim Bagby may refer to:

Jim Bagby, Sr. (1889–1954), pitcher who played in MLB from 1912 through 1923 
Jim Bagby, Jr. (1916–1988), All-Star pitcher who played in MLB from 1938 through 1947